A subaerial eruption is any sort of volcanic eruption that occurs on the Earth's surface, or in the open air 'under the air', and not underwater or underground. They generally produce pyroclastic flows, lava fountains, and lava flows, which are commonly classified in different subaerial eruption types, including Plinian, Peléan, and Hawaiian eruptions. Subaerial eruptions contrast with  subaqueous, submarine and subglacial eruptions which all originate below differing forms of a water surface.

References

Volcanic eruption types